Oreosaurus bisbali is a species of lizard in the family Gymnophthalmidae. It is endemic to Venezuela.

References

Oreosaurus
Reptiles of Venezuela
Endemic fauna of Venezuela
Reptiles described in 2021